Rodeo is a city and seat of the municipality of Rodeo, in the state of Durango, north-western Mexico. As of 2010, the town of Rodeo had a population of 4,666.

References

Populated places in Durango